The UCI Road World Championships are the annual world championships for bicycle road racing organized by the  (UCI). The UCI Road World Championships consist of events for road race and individual time trial, and  a mixed team relay.

Events

All the world championship events are ridden by national teams, not trade teams such as in most other major races. The winner of each category is entitled to wear the rainbow jersey in races of that category (either mass start or time trial) until the next championships.
It currently includes the following championships:

Elite Men's road race
Elite Men's time trial
Under-23 Men's road race
Under-23 Men's time trial
Junior Men's road race
Junior Men's time trial
Elite Women's road race
Elite Women's time trial
Junior Women's road race
Junior Women's time trial
Mixed team relay

Former events:
Men's amateur road race
Men's team time trial
Women's team time trial

History

The first world championships took place in 1921, though the only event that was contested was the men's road race for amateurs. The first professional world championship took place in July 1927 at the Nürburgring in Germany where Italian Alfredo Binda won the professional men's race and Belgian Jean Aerts won the men's amateur race. The women's road race was introduced in 1958. A men's team time trial, contested by national teams, was introduced in 1962. Beginning in 1972, the team time trial was discontinued in Olympic years only. Individual time trials in all categories were added in 1994, which was also the last year for the original incarnation of the men's team time trial. In 2012, the men's team time trial was reinstated, and a women's team time trial added to the program; both were contested by trade teams. In 2019, the team time trial events for men and women were replaced by a mixed relay team time trial.

Until 1995, there were separate races for male professional and amateur riders. In 1996, the amateur category was replaced with a category for men under-23 years old, with the professional category becoming an open (later elite) category.

Before that, the event had always been a summer race, held in late August or the first week of September (except for 1970, when it was a mid-season summer event).

From 2023, every fourth year the event will held as part of the combined multi-disciplinary UCI Cycling World Championships, the inaugural edition of which will be held in August.

The world championships are located in a different city or region every year. The event can be held over a relatively flat course which favors cycling sprinters or a hilly course which favors a climbing specialist or all-rounder.  In each case, the course is usually held on a circuit, of which the riders complete multiple laps.

Editions
Note: Not held from 1939 to 1945 because of World War II.

Hosts
Updated after 2022 UCI Road World Championships.

All Medals
Updated after 2021 UCI Road World Championships.
Medal table includes only medals achieved in senior events. Mixed nation team events such as the Team Time Trial from 2012 to 2018 are excluded.

Countries
  Belgium at the UCI Road World Championships
  Denmark at the UCI Road World Championships
  Germany at the UCI Road World Championships
  Italy at the UCI Road World Championships
  Lithuania at the UCI Road World Championships
  Netherlands at the UCI Road World Championships
  New Zealand at the UCI Road World Championships
  Spain at the UCI Road World Championships
  United States at the UCI Road World Championships

See also
UCI World Championships
European Road Championships
Triple Crown of Cycling

References

 
Road World Championships
Road bicycle races
Recurring sporting events established in 1921